Road House is a 1934 British comedy crime film directed by Maurice Elvey and starring Violet Loraine, Gordon Harker and Aileen Marson.

Production
The film is based on the 1932 play Road House by Walter C. Hackett. It was made by British Gaumont at the Lime Grove Studios in Shepherd's Bush, with shooting beginning in July 1934. The film's art direction is by Alfred Junge. British Gaumont's contract director Alfred Hitchcock was originally reported to be making the film, but instead directed The Man Who Knew Too Much.

Cast

References

Bibliography
 Goble, Alan. The Complete Index to Literary Sources in Film. Walter de Gruyter, 1999.
 Ryall, Tom. Alfred Hitchcock and the British Cinema. Athlone Press, 1996.
 Wood, Linda. British Films 1927-1939. BFI, 1986.

External links

1934 films
British crime comedy films
British black-and-white films
1930s crime comedy films
1930s English-language films
Films directed by Maurice Elvey
Films shot at Lime Grove Studios
British films based on plays
Films set in London
Films set in Nice
Gainsborough Pictures films
Films set in the 1910s
Films set in the 1920s
1934 comedy films
1930s British films